Ankit Kaushik (born 5 September 1991) is an Indian cricketer. He made his Twenty20 debut for Himachal Pradesh in the 2012–13 Syed Mushtaq Ali Trophy on 5 April 2015. He made his List A debut for Himachal Pradesh in the 2016–17 Vijay Hazare Trophy on 25 February 2017. He made his first-class debut for Himachal Pradesh in the 2017–18 Ranji Trophy on 14 October 2017.

He moved to Chandigarh cricket team for the 2019–20 Domestic season. In December 2019, in Chandigarh's match against Bihar in the 2019–20 Ranji Trophy, he scored his maiden century in first-class cricket.

References

External links
 

1991 births
Living people
Indian cricketers
Himachal Pradesh cricketers
Chandigarh cricketers
Cricketers from Chandigarh